Miss Grand International is a beauty pageant franchise based in Thailand. It consists of the annual national pageant Miss Grand Thailand, as well as the international competition Miss Grand International, to which participating rights are licensed to organizers in other countries.

The current Miss Grand International titleholder is Isabella Menin of Brazil, who was crowned on 25 October 2022 at Sentul International Convention Center in Sentul City, West Java, Indonesia.

History 

Miss Grand International was founded in 2013 by Nawat Itsaragrisil, a Thai television host and producer. The pageant was founded in Thailand amidst a political crisis, inspiring the organizers to use the slogan 'No mob, Stop the Wars' as part of its identity, later rephrased to 'Stop the War and Violence' in the following year. The pageant aims to promote peace by being against all kinds of conflicts.

The pageant has primarily been focusing on humanitarian issues with the reigning titleholders dedicating their year to work as the organization's spokesperson as well as involved in the charity events related to the said campaigns. For instance, corresponding with the United Nations High Commissioner for Refugees (UNHCR) to raise funds available for humanitarian aid, visiting and donated necessities to the internally displaced people in the refugee camps, being the guest speaker at the related events and act as the ambassador of the NGOs (e.g., Catholic Medical Mission Board, Model United Nations), or taking part in any projects of the local charitable organization in the visited countries. Before 2021, the winner of the contest, together with all runners-up, often serve as the campaigners of the Tourism Authority of Thailand, to promote the tourism industry of the pageant-based country.

The contest features contestants selected by licensees in each country. Its first three competitions were held in Thailand under the sponsorship of the country's government and televised worldwide via Channel 7, while subsequent events have also taken place overseas, and was broadcast via the local television channels together with the social media platforms including its official YouTube channel and Facebook page.

In 2019, the pageant was being held in Venezuela amid the country's political crisis; several candidates withdrew from the competition due to security concerns and visa regulation problems, such as South Korea, Cambodia, and Laos. Later in 2020, the pageant was also scheduled to be held in Venezuela on 25 October but due to the COVID-19 pandemic, the event was postponed to 2021 and the venue was moved to Bangkok, Thailand. As with the succeeding edition, , which was also held in Thailand with the preliminary events in Phuket, some ancillary activities was cancelled due to the opposing political views between the organizer and the pro-military government local community; which caused the application for property use to be revoked. The local government also declined to facilitate the event arrangement in the province. Since the Thai coup d'état in mid-2014, the organization's personnel have always been showing their political aspects against the country's military government, causing them to receive criticism from the ultraconservative and far-right political citizens, generally called Salim in Thai, on various social media platforms, and they have also been subjected to legal action after expressing their opinions against a government measure over the police and military violent crackdown on anti-government protests and the handling of the COVID-19 pandemic in early 2021. Many pageant contestants also took action against the Thailand military government for the aforementioned incidents, such as Helen Maher of Scotland and Samantha Bernardo of the Philippines.

Contestant selection 

The contestants of each edition of the pageant were selected by the franchise holder in respective countries or territories, through either a national contest, internal casting, or being hand-picked. Being a newly established international pageant, almost half of the participated contestants were selected as the national representative without acquiring the national title in the respective state pageant. Nonetheless, in pageant popular countries, especially in Far East and the Americas, annual national pageants are usually being held to crown a winner to compete in the Miss Grand International pageant, for example;  Miss Grand Cambodia, Miss Grand Malaysia, Miss Grand Nepal, and Miss Grand Paraguay, some of them were the runner-up or obtained the supplementary title at other national pageants, e.g. the delegates from Femina Miss India (2015–2021), Binibining Pilipinas (2013, 2015 – 2022), Miss Mexico (2017 – 2020), etc.

Despite not being considered an economically popular event in Europe and Africa, many countries have conducted national pageants, for instance, Miss Grand Albania, Miss Grand Kosovo, Miss Grand Spain, Miss Grand France,  Miss Grand Italy, and Miss Grand South Africa. In Spain, Italy, and many countries in Asia, each administrative division (i.e. province, state, region) holds a preliminary competition to choose their delegate for the national pageant. Moreover, in some provinces of Spain, Malaysia, and Thailand, local pageants are also held to determine delegates for the provincial competition, in which winners hold the title "Miss Grand (Province)" for the year of their reign. Unfortunately, cultural impediments in the swimsuit competition have precluded some countries, such as ultraconservative and Muslim countries, from participating, while some countries have not participated because of a lacking of funding.

Although the title of Miss Grand pageant was global registered copyright, some national or local pageants unrelated to the Miss Grand International has been observed such as the Azerbaijan model search contest named "Miss and Mister Grand Azerbaijan" which was organized by Elxan Pashayev since 2018, '"Miss Zimbabwe Grand", headed by Farai Zembeni since 2019, the pageant finalists participate in various continental contests in Africa, as well as the local pageant in the Bahamas, "Miss Grand Bahama", established in 1970, which the name "Grand Bahama" refer to the third largest island in the northernmost region of the country.

Contestants by continents

Main pageant 
Miss Grand International is the platform's annual international beauty pageant. Its inaugural edition was held in Bangkok in 2013 under sponsorship from Thailand's government and featured 73 participating countries; the inaugural titleholder was Janelee Chaparro of Puerto Rico. In 2016, the pageant was held for the first time outside Thailand, at Westgate Las Vegas, Las Vegas, US, on 25 October. Since 2015, the grand final is usually held on 25 October each year. However, due to the COVID-19 pandemic, the 2020 and 2021 editions of the pageant were delayed, the 2020 edition was first scheduled to be held on 25 October 2020, but was postponed to 27 March 2021, and the venue was also moved to Bangkok, Thailand, similar to the 2021 edition which was held in December 2021, two months behind the traditional schedule.

The current Miss Grand International titleholder is Isabella Menin of Brazil, who was crowned on 25 October 2022 at Sentul International Convention Center, West Java, Indonesia making her the first woman from Brazil to win the crown.

Pre-pageant activities 

The pre-pageant activities of Miss Grand International usually consist of three main events, the swimsuit competition, a national costume parade, and the preliminary contest. The swimsuit competition is organized at a separate venue to determine the winner of the Best in Swimsuit award while the national costume and the preliminary round of each edition are usually held at the same venue of the grand final round. All aforementioned events are live streamed via the pageant's Facebook and YouTube accounts. In the preliminary round, all contestants will compete in swimwear and evening gowns in front of a panel of preliminary judges. Each round of the preliminary competition and the Swimsuit competition will determine the winner of Best Evening Gown and Best in Swimsuit awards which will be announced later on the final stage of the contest as well as the winner of other special awards including Best National Costume and Miss Popular vote.  Moreover, the scores from all ancillary events, preliminary competition, together with a closed-door interview portion and the swimsuit competition, also determine the Top 20 finalists during the grand final telecast of the pageant.

Grand Final 

The grand final of the pageant is usually broadcast worldwide on television and the social media platforms of the pageant. As the tradition of the pageant, twenty semi-finalists are chosen from the initial pool of contestants through observation during the entire pageant, a closed-door interview, swimsuit round as well as a preliminary competition, which featured contestants competing in swimsuits and evening gowns. However, the "Country of the year" was first introduced in 2020 edition, which was selected by the audience on social networks. The winner of this category automatically enters the twenty finalists regardless of all previous scores. The Top 20 would then compete in a swimsuit competition, with 10 of them advancing to the Top 10, this number eventually was reduced to 9 with the 10th semi-finalist being the Top Popularity Winner determined through mobile voting, all 10 semi-finalists would then compete in an evening gown and give their speeches with a ‘Stop the War and Violence' theme.

After the speech round and evening gown competitions, the judges then select the top five to compete in the question-and-answer portion, where all entrants will be asked the same question about an ongoing global situation; such as the management of COVID-19 pandemic crisis, the 2016 United States presidential election, and the ongoing socioeconomic and political crisis in Venezuela. The judges will select the winner based on their answer and all previous accumulate scores, then the host will sequentially announce the fourth, third and second runners-up. The last 2 candidates of the top 5 finalists will stand in the center of the stage then one of them will be named Miss Grand International.

The summary of the pageant selection process is shown below.

Crowns and awards 

As the tradition of this pageant, the crown of the title holders, known as the Golden Crown, has been set to be changed every 3 years, all versions of the Golden Crown are made of gold and brass for structural integrity, while the exterior is adorned by diamond, and emerald. Its first version was designed by a Thai jewellery design company, God Diamond, headed by Chawalit Chommuang, and was used for the first three editions of the pageant. The crown used from 2016 – 2018 (2nd version) and 2019 – 2021 (3rd version) was designed by an unrevealed company and George Wittels, respectively.

The latest version of the golden crown, which was going to be used for the 2022 – 2024 edition, was also made by a Venezuelan jewellery designer, George Wittels, who signed as the official jewel sponsor of the Miss Grand International Organization during 2019 – 2024. He additionally designed the crown for all four runners-up of the pageant since the 2019 edition, the first time that the organization provided the crown for the runner-up positions.

Since 2014, the organizer has also been offering USD$ 40,000 cash to each year winner for spending a year work as the organization's spokesperson in its campaign, the prize was increased from USD$ 30,000 in 2013; however, some Vietnamese media published that Nguyễn Thúc Thùy Tiên earned USD$ 60,000 for winning the contest in 2021. Furthermore, all four runners-up of each edition, also received cash prizes, ABS-CBN reported that Samantha Bernardo of the Philippines got USD$ 6,000 in cash after she had obtained the first runner-up title at the Miss Grand International 2020 pageant in Bangkok, Thailand, Vartika Singh of India received USD$ 4,000 for her second runner-up finish at the 2015 edition, and 3,000 and US$$2,000 for the third and fourth runners-up, respectively. Besides the finalists, the winner of each special award also received a prize; approximately USD$ 1,000 – 3,000 according to the 2013 to 2015 contests.

After relinquishing the crown to the successor, the immediate predecessor is provided with a replica tiara; the replica is usually produced by the same designer as its master.

Gallery of Miss Grand International crowns

Titleholders 

Country/Territory by number of wins

Miss Grand International's winning countries and territories by the number of wins

 1 title
 1 dethroned title
 1 temporarily assumed title
 2 titles

Notes

Miss Grand International Limited 
Since its founding on 6 November 2013, the Miss Grand beauty pageant franchise has been managed by the Miss Grand International Company Limited (MGI Co.,Ltd.), a private limited company based in Thailand, currently headed by Nawat Itsaragrisil, a Thai television host and producer who had previously served as producer of Miss Thailand World for BEC-Tero. After ending his role with BEC-Tero, Nawat signed a business partnership with Channel 7 and subsequently established his national pageant, Miss Grand Thailand in mid-2013 and the newly established international pageant, Miss Grand International, which was later launched in the same year on 19 November.

Alongside its flagship beauty pageant, the company eventually expanded and diversified into the food-processing and cosmetics industries in 2018 as well as the talent management sector in 2019.

The MGI Co.,Ltd. was transformed into a public limited company with the registered capital of 105 million Baht (approx. US$30.00 million) on 15 June 2022 and is scheduled to be listed on the Stock Exchange of Thailand (SET) in late 2022.

Financial performance
For its fiscal year 2021 ending 31 December 2021, the company reported revenues of 345 million Baht; a 1% increase from the previous year, assets of 107 million Baht, and a net profit of 29 million Baht, the last two numbers down from the previous year.

Leadership

Major Shareholder

Controversies

Political-related issues 

At the grand final of the 2020 edition in Bangkok, Thailand, in addition to crowning the winner, the representative of Myanmar, Han Lay, also took the stage to make a declaration against alleged atrocities committed by the Myanmar military in her home country and requested international awareness of the ongoing democratic struggle following the military coup on 1 February 2021. She additionally requested the United Nations to take action against the Myanmar regime and pleaded for urgent international aid for the ongoing bloodshed. Following her speech, she received life-threatening criticisms on her social media accounts, but the vast majority of comments were supportive of her actions. Furthermore, the Myanmar military government allegedly issued an arrest warrant against her under a law against all material intended to cause a member of the armed forces to mutiny or disregard their duty, which caused her to apply for refugee status and a work permit in Thailand with the support of Burmese labor in Thailand. The pageant organizer also supported her with the necessary expenses and hired her as company personnel until she immigrated to Canada for political asylum in late 2021.

Another political impact also occurred in the following edition when the representative of Vietnam, Nguyễn Thúc Thùy Tiên, who was later elected 2021 winner, declared a sentence in Thai during the semi-finalists' speech round that means ' Make the world a better place for everyone' while raising the three-finger salute, a protest symbol inspired by the Hunger Games and has been adopted by many pro-democracy protest movements in Southeast Asian countries, which includes Thailand. The aforementioned action has greatly displeased supporters of the Thai military government, causing them to gather to present letters of protest to the Vietnamese embassy in Bangkok, accusing that her action is interfering in Thai internal affairs since the Constitutional Court of Thailand has determined that using the three-finger salute in Thailand is intended to overthrow the Thai regime. However, Vietnam's foreign affairs has no official diplomatic responsiveness to such an issue, despite some Thai government's political groups claiming that Vietnam's Ministry of Culture has made a statement to take action and remind her to refrain from making public speeches on issues that may affect Thailand–Vietnam relations. In addition, Radio Free Asia also reported that Thuy Tien's speech with the pro-democracy three-finger salute was censored by the Vietnamese government, which does not allow the domestic press to release any media, comments, or explain its meanings. In the case of regulatory violations, all materials were removed shortly after being published.  In the days after Thuy Tien's coronation, public compliments and supporting comments for her inspiring three-finger salute movement were observed on various Vietnamese press-released media, but most of those articles or paragraphs shortly disappeared, were no longer accessible, or the details was not mentioned. Moreover, in many press-released videos, the section of such action or even the entire video was removed.

Dethroned/Resignation 
Since the establishment of the contest, there was one case of resignation from her title when 2015 Miss Grand International winner Anea Garcia from Rhode Island, a Dominican American model, who later placed third in the Miss USA 2015 pageant then represented Dominican Republic in the Miss Grand International. She stepped down from her reign and was replaced by first runner-up Claire Elizabeth Parker from Australia in which the contest cited "with immediate effect, Miss Anea Garcia will step down from her position as Miss Grand International 2015 due to unable to fulfill and follow the contractual agreement with Miss Grand International Organization." The organization further stated, "her studies were in the way, making it very hard for us to schedule her activities."
Garcia was interviewed by The Providence Journal and stated that she resigned since "her safety was in jeopardy when she was sexually assaulted in South Sudan while representing the organization and [they] showed no concern about the incident" after she informed the organizers. The Miss Grand International later claimed that Garcia was "dethroned" for being "demanding and disrespectful" and for taking an "inappropriate photo while wearing the crown with a revealing slit in her dress in the upper leg-crotch area," as opposed to the organization's initial press release that she "stepped down."

Parker, who succeeded Anea Garcia as Miss Grand International 2015 after her resignation, was later stripped off from her title in February 2019, almost four years after her reign ended and the organization released a statement that she's no longer be addressed to as Miss Grand International 2015 when she decided to take part in a major national pageant title, Miss Universe Australia 2019 a preliminary of one of the Big Four international beauty pageants, Miss Universe.

Nawat Itsaragrisil 

Several statements and actions made by the pageant's founder, Nawat Itsaragrisil, have attracted controversy to the pageant itself.

In 2016, Nawat was reported by Miss Iceland 2015 Arna Ýr Jónsdóttir to have said that "she's too fat and needed to lose weight" prior to the finals of Miss Grand International 2016 held in Las Vegas on 25 October 2016, eventually dropping out of the pageant before the coronation due to the controversy. Jónsdóttir, a former member of the Icelandic national athletics team, stated "I decided to stand by myself and women in general, I'm not going to have anyone telling me that I am too fat to look good on stage." In a statement, Nawat said that they give similar advice to other contestants who asked what should they do to improve to win. Nawat eventually said that he had spoken with Jónsdóttir along with the company's vice president and clarified matters. The pageant organizers was also accused of withholding her passport and "threatened me by saying, you can get your passport back if you pay 3,000 dollars" after she withdrew from the contest. Jónsdóttir was eventually able to retrieve her passport.

Nawat has also expressed displeasure about the behavior of Filipino pageant fans online. This is after several incidents of Filipino pageant fans attacking him on social media. These incidents include accusations of Nawat rigging the results of Miss Grand International, of him having a bias against Filipina contestants, an Instagram post where Nawat insinuated that the coronation of Catriona Gray as Miss Universe 2018 was a rigged affair and saying that Miss Philippines 2018 didn't make it due to the rest of the contestants being better than her.

Nawat has also gotten into a verbal row with the Miss Supranational organization after the then reigning Miss Supranational Chanique Rabe did not include Miss Grand into what she considers the "Big Five" of pageants, saying that those pageants were "minor crowns".

Cultural appropriation 
The pageant stirred another controversy when the organizers allowed Emily Delgado, who represented the United States in the Miss Grand International 2019 to parade in a Native American-inspired costume with headdress and walked on the stage with stereotypical gestures in which she drew ire in the social media for cultural appropriation. The mockery of the Native values was initially confirmed and denounced by Ashley Callingbull of Alberta’s Enoch Cree Nation, Canada's first Indigenous woman to win the Mrs. Universe title in 2015.

Miss Grand National

In addition to Thailand, several national licensees have been separately organizing their preliminary pageants to select the representatives for the Miss Grand International pageant. As listed below, the lists were divided into 4 geographic continent groups, including; Africa, the Americas, Asia-Oceania, and Europe.

Africa
Legend

Liberia 
Liberia entered the Miss Grand International pageant for the first time in 2021. The country representative was Hajamaya Mulbah, one of the Miss Grand Liberia 2021 finalists, who was promoted to replace the original winner of such a contest, Goretti Itoka. The organizers cited Itoka wished to relinquish the title willingly, howbeit, Itoka later contended that she was removed without any direct clarification from the organizers. The Ministry of Information, Culture affairs, and Tourism of Liberia (MICAT) was also involved to manipulate the situation and has sent a communication document to the organizer, however, no organizer's official response.

The Miss Grand Liberia 2021 is the inaugural edition of Miss Grand Liberia beauty contest, due to the COVID-19 outbreak, the pageant was held virtually via Zoom application featuring 9 national finalists, in which a social media marketing strategist and the former Miss Mano River Union, Goretti Itoka, was elected as the national winner.

Botswana 
Botswana joined the Miss Grand International only once in 2014, with the representation of Lillian Lillie Dlamini, who won the inaugural national contest Miss Grand International Botswana 2014, outclassing 12 other finalists, The event was held on 26 July at Cresta Lodge Hotel in Gaborone, under the management of Dineo Matlapeng, a South Africa-based businessperson.

Zimbabwe 
In addition to Thailand, Zimbabwe is one of the other countries that separately held its Miss Grand national contest to select the representative for Miss Grand International in 2013. This inaugural edition of Miss Grand Zimbabwe was organized at Gardens Restaurant in the city of Bulawayo under the direction of the former Miss Tourism Zimbabwe 2010,Samantha Tshuma, which a 22 years old Tanzanian model Fungai Mawada announced the winner at a contest held on 13 July outclassing 15 other finalists. Nevertheless, Mawada was later disqualified on 2 September by the aforementioned organizer who nominated herself as the country representative at such an international contest and additionally stated that all 16 participating models were not suitable for the international competition, causing her to receive negative opinions from several modeling agencies. Tshuma was placed at Top 20 finalist of the swimsuit competition at the  pageant which was held in Thailand on 19 November.

Mhlanga claimed Nyathi's body was not good enough for the international pageant, however, Nyathi argued that she was removed because of refusing Mhlanga's love proposal as well as some financial issues between her and the organizer. Lillie Chopamba was the last Zimbabwe candidate at Miss Grand International, although the other national pageant with a similar name, Miss Zimbabwe Grand, was held annually since 2019 to determine the winners for several international platforms, but has no affiliation to the Miss Grand International.

North America
Legend

Bahamas
The Bahamas took part in the Miss Grand International pageant twice in 2016 and 2017, sequentially represented by Selvinique Wright and Rejean Bosh. Both of them were appointed to the position without participating in any respective contests. The national preliminary contest of the Bahamas for Miss Grand International was firstly held in 2018 after Navado Dawkins, the Nassau-based designer, purchased the license. Due to visa regulation problems, Bain was unable to participate in such an international platform. Since then, no national pageant has additionally been held or appointed country representative for the Miss Grand International.

The highest achievement of the Bahamas at Miss Grand International is the top 10 finalists in the 2016 edition, won by Selvinique Wright who also obtained the Best in Swimsuit of the said edition. Previously, Selvinique competed as Miss Star Fish Bay in the Miss Universe Bahamas 2016 pageant, where she finished as top 5 finalists then was selected by such an organization to compete in Las Vegas for the 2016 Miss Grand International title.

Canada

Canada began to organize the separate event for the Miss Grand International pageant in 2017, under the management of the Calgary-based model agency Di Benedetto Models, headed by Angelo Di Benedetto. However, the winner of the event, Maddison Fysh, resigned the title caused the organizer to appoint their affiliated model –Natalie Allin – to instead compete in the international competition. The same incident also happen in 2018, when the runner-up Grace Diamani was promoted to take over the position after the original winner – Veronica Rodriguez – had relinquished the national title for undisclosed reasons.

In 2019, Benedetto lost the franchise to Michelle Weswaldi, the president of the Miss World Canada pageant. The contest featured 23 national finalists, in which a Ukrainian-Canadian model Olga Bykadorova was announced the winner.

Canada has been sending its delegates to compete in the Miss Grand International since 2013. The highest achievement was the second runner-up in 2014, won by Kathryn Kohut, a model and actress from Alberta. Kohut was appointed to compete at such an edition after obtaining the first runner-up in the Miss Earth Canada 2014 contest in Montréal, the event was managed by the Filipino-Canadian organizer Ronaldo Soriano Trono, who served as the national director of Miss Grand Canada and South Korea during 2013 – 2015.

South America
Legend

Asia and Oceania
In Asia and Oceania, several national pageants was established to determine their representative for Miss Grand International specifically, including:
Legend

Europe
Legend

France

France has usually been participating in almost every edition of the Miss Grand International pageant, except in 2018. In the first era of the pageant, its representatives were appointed to join the contest by different national directors. However, after Sonia Mansour, former Miss Grand France, took over the franchise in 2019, the inaugural edition of Miss Grand France was finally happening under her directorship on 4 July 2019, in which Cassandra De Sousa was named the winner, outclassed 8 other national finalists. De Sousa later competed at Miss Grand International 2019 in Venezuela in October that year, unfortunately, she got non-placement.

Later in 2021, Mansour lost the franchise to the other organization, who arranged the contest amid the health restrictions linked to the COVID-19 pandemic, the contest consisted of 5 national finalists, and a 24-year-old model from Aquitaine, Elodie Sirulnick, was announced the winner. Along with the national crown, Sirulnick also won the prize for the Elegance and the Sympathy special awards.

Netherlands

The Netherlands has always been conducting the national contest to determine its representatives for the Miss Grand International pageant since 2013, except for 2015, 2019 and 2021, when the titleholders were assigned to the position instead of organizing the pageant.  In addition to crowning the national winner for the said contest, its candidates for several other international pageants were also chosen on the same stage, such as Miss Supranational Netherlands, Miss Earth Netherlands, etc. However, the organizer once conducted the contest to determine Miss Grand Netherlands separately in 2016. The contest was held on 5 June at the Aalsmeer Studios in the city of Aalsmeer featured 4 national finalists, in which an artist from Utrecht, Floor Masselink, was crowned Miss Grand Netherlands 2016. In 2020, the pageant was held virtually, due to the COVID-19 pandemic,

The Miss Grand Netherlands beauty pageant comes under the franchise of 12 Months of Beauty, which is run by Robin and Stefan Hoven – Lieuw Choy, the national directors. Their first placement at Miss Grand International is top 20 finalists in 2013, won by Talisa Wolters who obtained the Miss Grand national title after participating in Miss Grand & Supranational Netherlands 2013 contest, also held by Robin and Stefan. The Netherlands representatives also got the same placement in 2015, 2017 and 2021.

Participating countries and territories 
National franchises have a lot of latitude in choosing candidates for Miss Grand International. Some are the winners of individual contests for their Miss Grand International, others get the honor by winning first or second runner-up from contests for candidates to multiple international pageants, and yet others are chosen in different ways.

The following is the list of Miss Grand International participating countries and territories, the competition result, as well as the national licensee entities since 2013. The list was divided into 6 groups based on the geographic continents.

Africa

Asia

Europe

North America

Oceania

South America

See also 
 List of beauty contests

References

External links
 
 

 
International beauty pageants
Recurring events established in 2013
Beauty pageants in Thailand
2013 establishments in Thailand